"I am Going to the Lordy", alternatively titled "Simplicity", is a poem written by Charles J. Guiteau, the assassin of U.S. President James A. Garfield. He wrote it on June 30, 1882, the morning of his execution. He read it at the gallows.

"I am Going to the Lordy" was used as a base for the song "The Ballad of Guiteau" in the Stephen Sondheim musical Assassins, where Guiteau sings a version of the song while cakewalking up and down the scaffold.

Reading 
On 30 June 1882, the day of the execution of Guiteau for the assassination of President James Garfield, Guiteau announced, after famously dancing his way to the gallows, that he would read a poem that he had written. Guiteau said that he had written the poem, which was entitled "I am Going to the Lordy", at about 10:00 a.m. Eastern Standard Time that day. After "stubbing his toe on the way to the gallows", as he put it to the executioner, Guiteau read  and announced that he would now read a prayer of his own composition. After paraphrasing , Guiteau proceeded to read the poem from a piece of paper in a style described as both "sad and doleful" as well as "high pitched" and "childlike". Guiteau had requested an orchestra to play behind him as he recited his poem, but his request was denied. After completing the first verse in song, Guiteau stopped singing and chanted the rest. Multiple times during the reading, Guiteau's voice would fail and he would begin sobbing, even stopping to lay his head on the shoulder of a man standing by him. Right before the completion of the poem, Guiteau raised his voice even higher into falsetto to deliver the final two lines. As the executioner fitted the hood over Guiteau's head and put the rope around his neck, he held onto the piece of paper on which he had written his poem. As per request with the executioner, Guiteau signaled that he was ready to die by dropping the paper.

It was a long-held belief that Guiteau himself wrote the folk song "Charles Guiteau". It is theorized that the song resulted from the truth that Guiteau wrote "I am Going to the Lordy" and was believed because of the way it was written.

Text

Before reciting his poem, Guiteau stated, "I am now going to read some verses which are intended to indicate my feelings at the moment of leaving this world.  If set to music they may be rendered very effective.  The idea is that of a child babbling to his mamma and his papa.  I wrote it this morning about ten o'clock."

The poem is repetitive, containing numerous Hallelujahs and other glories to God. In it, Guiteau describes himself as the savior of both his "party" and his "land," but laments that his country has murdered him for it.

Reception and commentary 
Many of Guiteau's contemporaries believed that he was seriously deranged, and "I am Going to the Lordy" helped exemplify their point. Combined with his behavior at the trial, which included frequent profanity and insults towards nearly everyone in the court, writing epic poems as his testimony, and soliciting legal advice from spectators via passed notes, the poem convinced many spectators that Guiteau was insane. "I am Going to the Lordy" was marked as "pathetic", and the entire event was labeled as "obvious imbecility." The people who came out to watch the execution "shout[ed], hoot[ed], curs[ed], and boo[ed]" as Guiteau came up on stage and recited his poem.

In the musical Assassins 
"I am Going to the Lordy" is a featured part of the Stephen Sondheim musical Assassins. In the song "The Ballad of Guiteau", Guiteau sings an exaggerated version of the poem more and more fervently while the Balladeer sings about Guiteau's life, trial, and execution. Sondheim has said that the use of the poem in the song was one of two times he had ever borrowed from another writer in his work, the other being the time he used lines from William Shakespeare in the song "Fear No More" from The Frogs. Sondheim first learned of the poem from the short story by Charles Gilbert on which Assassins is based. He was going to include pieces of letters and diaries written by Guiteau as well but felt that those would "weigh the piece down." The contrast of the "fervent yet hymn-like poem" and the styles of music in the song continue to suggest Guiteau's insanity, a trait exemplified frequently in the musical. 

After Guiteau sings his poem unaccompanied and quietly, the Balladeer sings a verse, which is followed by Guiteau cakewalking up and down the scaffold and singing "Look on the Bright Side". He stops a step or two higher and begins singing the hymn again. After the third verse, Guiteau begins cakewalking when he reaches the noose and stops suddenly. He then begins singing his poem again, although this time much more forcefully and resolutely before the Balladeer interrupts and leads Guiteau to his death. Jim Lovensheimer implies that the use of the cakewalk interjected in the ballad show Guiteau looking for a prize, as the best cakewalker on a plantation would be awarded a prize. The lyrics of "The Ballad of Guiteau", including the parts taken from "I am Going to the Lordy", help to show Guiteau as a devoted but misguided Christian who "lost a grip on reality." 

Howard Kissel said that "The Ballad of Guiteau" was one of the oddest songs of Assassins due to the use of the poem.

See also 
 Charles Guiteau (song)
 Death poem

References 

1882 poems
Assassination of James A. Garfield
English-language poems